Living Under June is the second album by the Canadian singer-songwriter Jann Arden, released in 1994.

"Could I Be Your Girl", "Insensitive" and "Good Mother" were all significant hits for Arden in Canada, with "Wonderdrug", "Unloved" and "Looking for It (Finding Heaven)" also becoming Canadian adult-contemporary hits. "Insensitive" was Arden's biggest hit internationally, entering the Top 40 in several countries, including Italy and the United States ( 12 on the Billboard Hot 100).  In the U.S., "Could I Be Your Girl" was also a minor adult contemporary chart hit (No. 33). Total worldwide sales for this album come to 1.3 million, with 600,000 Canadian, and 500,000 US.

The video for "Good Mother", directed by Jeth Weinrich, won the Juno Award for Video of the Year at the 1996 Juno Awards. Weinrich also directed the video for "Insensitive", which was a nominee for the same award, but did not win, at the 1995 Juno Awards.

Production
The album was produced by Ed Cherney and Arden. Most of the songs were written in a Calgary basement, where Arden lived under her landlady, June. Jackson Browne duets with Arden on "Unloved". Anne Loree wrote "Insensitive". Kenny Aronoff played drums on the album.

Track listing
All songs written by Jann Arden, except where noted.

"Could I Be Your Girl" – 4:48
"Demolition Love" – 4:04
"Looking for It (Finding Heaven)" (Arden, Robert Foster) – 3:53
"Insensitive" (Anne Loree) – 4:16
"Gasoline" – 4:35
"Wonderdrug" (Arden, Mike Lent) – 3:35
"Living Under June" – 4:02
"Unloved" (with Jackson Browne) – 4:14
"Good Mother" (Arden, Foster) – 4:58
"It Looks Like Rain" (Arden, Foster) – 4:53
"I Would Die for You" (Bonus track on international release) – 4:35

"I Would Die for You" was a significant single from Arden's previous album, Time for Mercy, and does not appear on this album's original version.

Personnel
Jann Arden – acoustic guitar, vocals
Bob Foster – acoustic and electric guitars
David Resnik – acoustic and electric guitars
Jeffrey (C. J.) Vanston – synthesizers, Wurlitzer and acoustic piano, Hammond B-3 organ, drum programming
Mike Lent – bass guitar, acoustic guitar ("Wonderdrug")
Kenny Aronoff – drums, percussion
Jackson Browne – duet on ("Unloved")
Ed Cherney – backing vocals ("Looking for It (Finding Heaven)")
Lin Elder, Dillon O'Brian – backing vocals

Production
Arranged by Jann Arden, Ed Cherney and Jeffrey Vanston, with vocal backing arranged by Dillon O'Brien and band charts by Peggy Sandvig
Neil MacGonigill: Executive Producer
Produced by Jann Arden and Ed Cherney; production assisted by Edd Kolakowski; assisted by Carrie McConkey; production co-ordination by Marsha Burns
Recording Engineers: Ed Cherney and Duane Seykora; assisted by Raymond Taylor-Smith and Ronnie Rivera
Mixed by Ed Cherney
Mastered by Doug Sax
Piano and guitar technician: Edd Kolakowski
Artwork and design by Jann Arden, Jeth Weinrich and Margo McKee, with photography by Jeth Weinrich

Charts

References

External links
Living Under June at Discogs

Jann Arden albums
1994 albums
A&M Records albums